Jandrai /jandrai/jandrai is urdu meaning of watermill. The village Jhandri is, named after that, in  Union Council in Karak District of Khyber Pakhtunkhwa.

References

Populated places in Karak District
Karak District